First Presbyterian Church in Tacoma, Washington is a historic congregation founded in 1873.  Its current Romanesque building was designed by noted church architect Ralph Adams Cram, Mr. Earl N. Dugan (Sutton, Whitney and Dugan), who was locally in charge of construction, completed in 1925, and is a landmark of the Stadium District.  In 2012 the church voted to leave the Presbyterian Church (U.S.A.) and affiliate with the more Evangelical, ECO: A Covenant Order of Evangelical Presbyterians.  The church is adjacent to Tacoma Bible Presbyterian Church, which split off of First Presbyterian in 1935 and purchased the neighboring Scottish Rite Masonic Temple which fronts on the Wright Park Arboretum.

Tower

The architect, Ralph Adams Cram, was a fervent Anglo-Catholic and devoted to imbuing his designs with rich symbolism. This is most visible at First Presbyterian in the decoration of the tower, which in earlier times served as a landmark for ships approaching the Port of Tacoma. The tower houses a two-octave set of chimes, made by J.C. Deagan Company of Chicago, and the balustrade has a niche in the center of each side with a statue of one of the Four Evangelists. Each side of the octagonal dome bears a Christian symbol:

References

External links

Official website
Virtual tour of the sanctuary
Churches in Tacoma, Washington
Ralph Adams Cram church buildings
ECO: A Covenant Order of Evangelical Presbyterians
Presbyterian churches in Washington (state)
1873 establishments in Washington Territory
Churches completed in 1925